Asian Kabaddi Championship is a standard style Kabaddi tournament. It was first held in 1980. The 10th tournament was held in Iran and won by India.

Men

Women

References

Kabaddi competitions
Recurring sporting events established in 1980